The Wickerr Stakes is an American Thoroughbred horse race held annually in mid-July at Del Mar Racetrack in Del Mar, California. A restricted stakes, it is limited to horses age three and older that are Non-Winners Of A Sweepstakes Of $50,000 Other Than State Bred. It is contested on turf over a distance of one mile (8 furlongs).

The race is named in honour of Wickerr , a horse who won a number of important races at Del Mar Racetrack for his prominent Rancho Santa Fe, California owner, Edmund A. Gann.

Records
Speed record:
 1:32.22 @ 1 mile: Touch of the Blues (2003)

Most wins:
 2 - Becrux (2006, 2007)

Most wins by a jockey:
 4 - Gary Stevens  (1991, 2013, 2017, 2018)

Most wins by a trainer:
 4 - Julio C. Canani (1991, 2002, 2005, 2010)

Most wins by an owner:
 3 - Jack, Art, & J. R. Preston (2002, 2005, 2010)

Winners

* † In 2000, American Spirit won but was disqualified to second for bumping Riviera in the stretch.

References

 The 2009 Wickerr Stakes at ESPN
 The 2009 Wickerr Stakes at the NTRA

Del Mar Racetrack
Horse races in California
Restricted stakes races in the United States
Open mile category horse races
Turf races in the United States
Recurring sporting events established in 1990
1990 establishments in California